Río Jacaguas is a river shared between the municipalities of Ponce and Juana Díaz in Puerto Rico. It flows from north to south, draining into the Caribbean Sea east of the city of Ponce. The river has a discharge of 37,000 ft3/second, making it also Ponce's most affluent river.

Origin and course
It crosses the municipalities of Villalba and Juana Díaz, forming the Guayabal Lake, before approaching the municipality of Ponce where it becomes the boundary between Ponce and Juana Díaz most of its trajectory. From there it empties into the Caribbean Sea.

See also
 List of rivers of Puerto Rico
 List of rivers of Ponce

References

Rivers of Puerto Rico
Rivers of Ponce, Puerto Rico
Barrio Capitanejo